The Wadjabangai, otherwise known as Wadjabangayi, were an indigenous Australian people of Queensland.

Language
Wadjabangai was closely related to Bidjara.

Country
The Wadjabangai lived in the area south of Lancevale, including Maryvale and as far as Blackall.

Alternative names
 Karimari. (from ka:ri, salt and mari, men).

Notes

Citations

Sources

Aboriginal peoples of Queensland